The Philippine Basketball Association (PBA) presents twelve annual awards to recognize its teams, players, and coaches for their accomplishments. An additional seven awards officially recognized by the PBA were also given annually by the PBA Press Corps during a season break. This does not include the championship trophies for the Philippine, Commissioner's and Governors' Cups which are given to the winning team of its respective finals.

The league awarded trophies with varying designs for their tournament/conference champions from 1975 to 1993 until the trophy designs were standardized in 1994 for the All-Filipino, Commissioner's and Governors' Cups.

The Commissioner's and Governors' Cups were deactivated in 2003, when the name of the second and third conferences were changed to Invitational and Reinforced Conferences. Further changes in the tournament calendar were made in 2004 when the league decided to hold only two tournaments per season; the All-Filipino Cup, renamed as the Philippine Cup and the import-laced Fiesta Conference.

The Philippine Cup trophy design also varied from 2003 to 2006. In 2007, a new trophy, named the "Perpetual Trophy", later named as the Jun Bernardino Trophy was made for the winners of the said tournament. In 2010, the league re-adopted the three-conference season format and reactivated the Commissioner's and Governors' Cups as the second and third conference of the PBA season.

Aside from these annual awards, the league also has weekly honors during the conference for its players.

Each individual award, with the exception of the Best Player of the Conference, Best Import and Finals MVP (which are given near the conclusion of the conference), is awarded during the PBA Leo Awards, which is held before the start of the fourth game (or third game if it is a best-of-five) of the third conference's finals series.

Team trophies
Note: The league awarded different trophy designs for the All-Filipino Conference/Philippine Cup from 1975 to 1994 and from 2003 to 2007. The other import-laced, non-consecutive and special conferences from 1975 to 2010 such as the Open, Reinforced, Invitational, and Fiesta Conferences have different trophy designs per tournament. The Commissioner's and Governors' Cups were first awarded in 1993, albeit a different trophy design.

Honors

Individual season awards

Individual conference awards

See also
40 Greatest Players in PBA History
PBA Hall of Fame

References

Awards